The Free Press is a pub in Prospect Row, Cambridge, England.

The tiny snug, 6x5ft, is "surely the smallest pub room in Cambridgeshire", and the fittings are either original from the 1940s or copies. It is on the Regional Inventory of Historic Pub Interiors for East Anglia.

References

External links
Official website

Pubs in Cambridge